The Selection 37 is a French sailboat that was designed by the Joubert-Nivelt design firm, as a racer-cruiser specifically for the Tour de France à la voile and first built in 1984.

The Selection 37 was the one design class boat for the Tour de France à la voile from 1984 to 1991.

Production
The design was built by Jeanneau in France, from 1984 until 1991, with 251 boats completed. It was produced in "owners" and "Royale Tour de France" racing team versions.

Design
The Selection 37 is a racing keelboat, built predominantly of polyester fiberglass, with wood trim. The hull is made from solid fiberglass, with Kevlar optional, while the deck is a fibergalss-balsa sandwich. The boat has a 7/8 fractional sloop rig, with a keel-stepped mast, two sets of unswept spreaders and aluminum spars with 1X19 discontinuous stainless steel wire rigging. The hull has a raked stem, a reverse transom, an internally mounted spade-type rudder controlled by a tiller and a fixed fin keel. It displaces  and carries  of ballast.

The design has sleeping accommodation for seven people, with a double "V"-berth in the bow cabin, dual straight settees in the main cabin and two aft cabins with double berths. The galley is located on the port side just forward of the companionway ladder and is equipped with a two-burner stove and a sink. A navigation station is opposite the galley, on the starboard side. The head is located to starboard of the companionway. The owner's version also includes a forward main cabin table.

Operational history
During its heyday as the Tour de France à la voile boat it was supported by that organization as a one-design class.

See also
List of sailing boat types

References

External links
 - contains errors

Keelboats
1980s sailboat type designs
Sailing yachts
One-design sailing classes
Sailboat type designs by Joubert-Nivelt
Sailboat types built by Jeanneau
Tour de France à la voile